The 2014 Cleveland Indians season was the 114th season for the franchise. They finished in third place, five games back in the Central Division.

Offseason

Departures
 On November 23, 2013, relief pitcher Joe Smith signed a three-year deal with the Los Angeles Angels.
Scott Kazmir agreed to a two-year, $24 million contract with the Oakland Athletics on December 3, 2013.

Arrivals
 On November 1, 2013, Jason Giambi re-signed to a minor league contract with an invitation to spring training.
 On November 25, 2013, the Indians signed former Texas Rangers outfielder David Murphy to a two-year contract with a club option for a third year.

Regular season
The Indians opened their season on March 31, a 2-0 win over the Oakland Athletics.  Their home opener, which was four days later, sold out in 15 minutes, one of the fastest sellouts in team history.

Opening Day Starting Lineup 
 CF Nyjer Morgan
 1B Nick Swisher
 2B Jason Kipnis
 3B Carlos Santana
 LF Michael Brantley
 DH Ryan Raburn
 SS Asdrúbal Cabrera
 RF David Murphy
 C Yan Gomes

Season standings

American League Central

American League Wild Card

Record vs. Opponents

Detailed Records
(updated through September 28)

Game log

|-  style="text-align:center; background:#bfb;"
| 1 || March 31 || @ Athletics || 2-0 || Allen (1-0) || Johnson (0-1) || Axford (1) || 36,067 || 1-0
|-  style="text-align:center; background:#bbb;"
|   || April 1 || @ Athletics || colspan=6| Postponed (rain). Makeup: April 2 (Game 1)
|-  style="text-align:center; background:#fbb;"
| 2 || April 2 || @ Athletics || 6-1 || Kazmir (1-0) || Kluber (0-1) || || 15,134 || 1-1
|-  style="text-align:center; background:#bfb;"
| 3 || April 2 || @ Athletics || 6-4 || Allen (2-0) || Johnson (0-2) || Axford (2) || 12,198 || 2-1
|-  style="text-align:center; background:#bfb;"
| 4 || April 4 || Twins || 7-2 || Outman (1-0) || Pelfrey (0-1) || || 41,274 || 3-1
|-  style="text-align:center; background:#fbb;"
| 5 || April 5 || Twins || 7-3 || Gibson (1-0) || Carrasco (0-1) || || 14,153 || 3-2
|-  style="text-align:center; background:#fbb;"
| 6 || April 6 || Twins || 10-7 || Swarzak (1-0) || Wood (0-1) || Perkins (2) || 13,104 || 3-3
|-  style="text-align:center; background:#bbb;"
|   || April 7 || Padres || colspan=6| Postponed (rain). Makeup: April 9 (Game 2)
|-  style="text-align:center; background:#bfb;"
| 7 || April 8 || Padres || 8-6 || Kluber (1-1) || Ross (0-2) || Axford (3) || || 4-3
|-  style="text-align:center; background:#bfb;"
| 8 || April 9 || Padres || 2-0 || McAllister (1-0) || Stults (0-2) || Axford (4) || 9,029 || 5-3
|-  style="text-align:center; background:#fbb;"
| 9 || April 9 || Padres || 2-1 || Erlin (1-0) || Bauer (0-1) || Street (3) || 9,930 || 5-4
|-  style="text-align:center; background:#fbb;"
| 10 || April 10 || @ White Sox || 7-3 || Danks (1-0) || Salazar (0-1) ||  || 11,116 || 5-5
|-  style="text-align:center; background:#fbb;"
| 11 || April 11 || @ White Sox || 9-6 || Sale (3-0) || Carrasco (0-2) ||  || 13,605 || 5-6
|-  style="text-align:center; background:#bfb"
| 12 || April 12 || @ White Sox || 12-6 || Outman (2-0) || Belisario (1-1) ||  || 27,332 || 6-6
|-  style="text-align:center; background:#fbb;"
| 13 || April 13 || @ White Sox || 4-3 || Lindstrom (1-1) || Axford (0-1) ||  || 14,281 || 6-7
|-  style="text-align:center; background:#bbb;"
| || April 15 || @ Tigers || colspan=6| Postponed ("cold"). Makeup: July 19 (Game 1)
|-  style="text-align:center; background:#bfb;"
| 14 || April 16 || @ Tigers || 3-2 || McAllister (2-0) || Sánchez (0-1) || Axford (5) || 23,811 || 7-7
|-  style="text-align:center; background:#fbb;"
| 15 || April 17 || @ Tigers || 7-5 || Verlander (2-1) || Salazar (0-2) || Nathan (2) || 25,990 || 7-8
|-  style="text-align:center; background:#fbb;"
| 16 || April 18 || Blue Jays || 3-2 || Delabar (1-0) || Rzepczynski (0-1) || Santos (5) || 16,335 || 7-9
|-  style="text-align:center; background:#fbb;"
| 17 || April 19 || Blue Jays || 5-0 || Buehrle (4-0) || Kluber (1-2) || || 15,188 || 7-10
|-  style="text-align:center; background:#bfb;"
| 18 || April 20 || Blue Jays || 6-4 || Outman (3-0) || Loup (1-1) || Axford (6) || 11,716 || 8-10
|-  style="text-align:center; background:#bfb;"
| 19 || April 21 || Royals || 4-3 || McAllister (3-0) || Guthrie (2-1) || Axford (7) || 10,789 || 9-10
|-  style="text-align:center; background:#fbb;"
| 20 || April 22 || Royals || 8-2 || Shields (2-2) || Salazar (0-3) || || 8,848 || 9-11
|-  style="text-align:center; background:#bfb;"
| 21 || April 23 || Royals || 5-3 || Shaw (1-0) || Herrera (0-1) || Axford (8) || 9,311 || 10-11
|-  style="text-align:center; background:#bfb;"
| 22 || April 24 || Royals || 5-1 || Kluber (2-2) || Chen (1-2) || || 10,440 || 11-11
|-  style="text-align:center; background:#fbb;"
| 23 || April 25 || @ Giants || 5-1 || Hudson (3-1) || Carrasco (0-3) || || 41,296 || 11-12
|-  style="text-align:center; background:#fbb;"
| 24 || April 26 || @ Giants || 5-3 || Gutierrez (1-1) || McAllister (3-1) || Romo (6) || 42,088 || 11-13
|-  style="text-align:center; background:#fbb;"
| 25 || April 27 || @ Giants || 4-1 || Romo (2-0) || Allen (2-1) || || 41,530 || 11-14
|-  style="text-align:center; background:#fbb;"
| 26 || April 28 || @ Angels || 6-3 || Salas (2-0) || Masterson (0-1) || Smith (1) || 37,654 || 11-15
|-  style="text-align:center; background:#fbb;"
| 27 || April 29 || @ Angels || 6-4 || Weaver (2-2) || Kluber (2-3) || Smith (2) || 35,131 || 11-16
|-  style="text-align:center; background:#fbb;"
| 28 || April 30 || @ Angels || 7-1 || Wilson (4-2) || McAllister (3-2) || || 33,334 || 11-17
|-

|-  style="text-align:center; background:#bfb;"
| 29 || May 2 || White Sox || 12-5 || Salazar (1-3)  || Danks (2–2) || || 15,518 || 12-17
|-  style="text-align:center; background:#bfb;"
| 30 || May 3 || White Sox || 2-0 || Masterson (1-1) || Carroll (1-1) || Axford (9) || 15.834 || 13-17
|-  style="text-align:center; background:#fbb;"
| 31 || May 4 || White Sox || 4-3 || Webb (2-0) || Axford (0-2) || Lindstrom (4) || 13,455 || 13-18
|-  style="text-align:center; background:#fbb;"
| 32 || May 5 || Twins || 1-0 (10) || Thielbar (2-0) || Axford (0-3) || Perkins (8) || 9,037 || 13-19
|-  style="text-align:center; background:#bfb;"
| 33 || May 6 || Twins || 4-2 || Tomlin (1-0) || Deduno (0-2) || Shaw (1) || 9,621 || 14-19
|-  style="text-align:center; background:#bfb;"
| 34 || May 7 || Twins || 4-3 || Axford (1-3) || Fien (3-1) || || 10,742 || 15-19
|-  style="text-align:center; background:#bfb;"
| 35 || May 8 || Twins || 9-4 || Masterson (2-1) || Correia (1-4) || || 13,095 || 16-19
|-  style="text-align:center; background:#bfb;"
| 36 || May 9 || @ Rays || 6-3 || Kluber (3-3) || Peralta (1-3) || Allen (1) || 17,541 || 17-19
|-  style="text-align:center; background:#fbb;"
| 37 || May 10 || @ Rays || 7-1 || Bédard (2-1) || McAllister (3-3) || || 29,212 || 17-20
|-  style="text-align:center; background:#bfb;"
| 38 || May 11 || @ Rays || 6-5 || Tomlin (2-0) || Archer (2-2) || Shaw (2) || 23,679 || 18-20
|-  style="text-align:center; background:#fbb;"
| 39 || May 13 || @ Blue Jays || 5-4 || Dickey (4-3) || Masterson (2-2) || Janssen (1) || 13,673 || 18-21
|-  style="text-align:center; background:#bfb;"
| 40 || May 14 || @ Blue Jays || 15-4 || Kluber (4-3) || McGowan (2-2) || || 14,068 || 19-21
|-  style="text-align:center; background:#fbb;"
| 41 || May 15 || @ Blue Jays || 4-2 || Happ (2-1) || Salazar (1-4) || Janssen (2) || 17,364 || 19-22
|-  style="text-align:center; background:#fbb;"
| 42 || May 16 || Athletics || 11-1 || Gray (5-1) || McAllister (3-4) || || 21,389 || 19-23
|-  style="text-align:center; background:#fbb;"
| 43 || May 17 || Athletics || 6-2 || Otero (4-0) || Tomlin (2-1) || || 18,358 || 19-24
|-  style="text-align:center; background:#fbb;"
| 44 || May 18 || Athletics || 13-3 || Chavez (4-1) || Masterson (2-3) || || 14,872 || 19-25
|-  style="text-align:center; background:#bfb;"
| 45 || May 19 || Tigers || 5-4 (10) || Atchison (1-0) || Alburquerque (1-1) || || 12,709 || 20-25
|-  style="text-align:center; background:#bfb;"
| 46 || May 20 || Tigers || 6-2 || Bauer (1-1) || Verlander (5-3) || || 13,924 || 21-25
|-  style="text-align:center; background:#bfb;"
| 47 || May 21 || Tigers || 11-10 (13) || Tomlin (3-1) || Coke (0-1) || || 19,228 || 22-25
|-  style="text-align:center; background:#bfb;"
| 48 || May 22 || @ Orioles || 8-7 (13) || Outman (4-0) || Patton (0-1) || Atchison (1) || 18,849 || 23-25
|-  style="text-align:center; background:#fbb;"
| 49 || May 23 || @ Orioles || 8-4 || Norris (3-4) || House (0-1) || || 39,602 || 23-26
|-  style="text-align:center; background:#bfb;"
| 50 || May 24 || @ Orioles || 9-0 || Kluber (5-3) || Jiménez (2-6) || || 36,873 || 24-26
|-  style="text-align:center; background:#fbb;"
| 51 || May 25 || @ Orioles || 4-2 || González (3-3) || Bauer (1-2) || Britton (2) || 37,649 || 24-27
|-  style="text-align:center; background:#fbb;"
| 52 || May 26 || @ White Sox || 6-2 || Quintana (3-4) || Tomlin (3-2) || Downs (1) || 17,075 || 24-28
|-  style="text-align:center; background:#fbb;"
| 53 || May 27 || @ White Sox || 2-1 || Carroll (2-3) || Masterson (2-4) || Belisario (3) || 14,237 || 24-29
|-  style="text-align:center; background:#fbb;"
| 54 || May 28 || @ White Sox || 3-2 || Belisario (3-3) || Shaw (1-1) || || 14,228 || 24-30
|-  style="text-align:center; background:#bfb;"
| 55 || May 30 || Rockies || 2-5 || Kluber (6-3) || Nicasio (5-3) || Allen (2) || 25,066 || 25-30
|-  style="text-align:center; background:#bfb;"
| 56 || May 31 || Rockies || 6-7 || Shaw (2-1) || Brothers (2-3) || Allen (3) || 20,174 || 26-30
|-

|-  style="text-align:center; background:#bfb;"
| 57 || June 1 || Rockies || 6-4 || Atchison (2-0) || Ottavino (0-2) || || 16,682 || 27-30
|-  style="text-align:center; background:#bfb;"
| 58 || June 2 || Red Sox || 3-2 || Masterson (3-4) || Lackey (6-4) || Allen (4) || 14,078 || 28-30
|-  style="text-align:center; background:#bfb;"
| 59 || June 3 || Red Sox || 5-3 || Hagadone (1-0) || Peavy (1-3) || Allen (5) || 18,738 || 29-30
|-  style="text-align:center; background:#bfb;"
| 60 || June 4 || Red Sox || 7-4 (12) || Carrasco (1-3) || Mujica (2-2) || || 20,209 || 30-30
|-  style="text-align:center; background:#fbb;"
| 61 || June 6 || @ Rangers || 6-4 || Darvish (6-2) || Rzepczynski (0-2) || Soria (13) || 38,348 || 30-31
|-  style="text-align:center; background:#bfb;"
| 62 || June 7 || @ Rangers || 8-3 || Tomlin (4-2) || Tepesch (2-2) || || 34,633 || 31-31
|-  style="text-align:center; background:#bfb;"
| 63 || June 8 || @ Rangers || 3-2 || Masterson (4-4) || Saunders (0-2) || Allen (6) || 34,613 || 32-31
|-  style="text-align:center; background:#bfb;"
| 64 || June 9 || @ Rangers || 17-7 || Atchison (3-0) || Martinez (1-3) || || 29,362 || 33-31
|-  style="text-align:center; background:#fbb;"
| 65 || June 10 || @ Royals || 9-5 || Vargas (6-2) || Kluber (6-4) || Crow (1) || 25,540 || 33-32
|-  style="text-align:center; background:#fbb;"
| 66 || June 11 || @ Royals || 4-1 || Ventura (4-5) || Bauer (1-3) || Holland (19) || 19,938 || 33-33
|-  style="text-align:center; background:#fbb;"
| 67 || June 12 || @ Red Sox || 5-2 || Lester (7-7) || Tomlin (4-3) || Uehara (14) || 37,750 || 33-34
|-  style="text-align:center; background:#fbb;"
| 68 || June 13 || @ Red Sox || 10-3 || Lackey (8-4) || Masterson (4-5) || || 35,772 || 33-35
|-  style="text-align:center; background:#bfb;"
| 69 || June 14 || @ Red Sox || 3-2 || Axford (2-3) || Breslow (2-2) || Allen (7) || 37,181 || 34-35
|-  style="text-align:center; background:#bfb;"
| 70 || June 15 || @ Red Sox || 3-2 (11) || Allen (3-1) || Tazawa (1-1) || || 37,356 || 35-35
|-  style="text-align:center; background:#bfb;"
| 71 || June 16 || Angels || 4-3 || Bauer (2-3) || Weaver (7-6) || Carrasco (1) || 14,716 || 36-35
|-  style="text-align:center; background:#fbb;"
| 72 || June 17 || Angels || 9-3 || Shoemaker (4-1) || Tomlin (4-4)  || || 14,639 || 36-36
|-  style="text-align:center; background:#bbb;"
| -- || June 18 || Angels || colspan=6| Postponed (rain). Makeup: September 8
|-  style="text-align:center; background:#bfb;"
| 73 || June 19 || Angels || 5-3 (10) || Crockett (1-0) || Bedrosian (0-1) || || 20,361 || 37-36
|-  style="text-align:center; background:#fbb;"
| 74 || June 20 || Tigers || 6-4 || Porcello (9-4) || Kluber (6-5) || Nathan (15) || 33,545 || 37-37
|-  style="text-align:center; background:#fbb;"
| 75 || June 21 || Tigers || 5-4 (10) || Nathan (4-2) || Allen (3-2) || Coke (1) || 40,712 || 37-38
|-  style="text-align:center; background:#fbb;"
| 76 || June 22 || Tigers || 10-4 || Scherzer (9-3) || Tomlin (4-5) || || 26,023 || 37-39
|-  style="text-align:center; background:#fbb;"
| 77 || June 24 || @ Diamondbacks || 9-8 (14) || Collmenter (6-4) || Lowe (0-1) || || 20,945 || 37-40
|-  style="text-align:center; background:#bfb;"
| 78 || June 25 || @ Diamondbacks || 6-1 || Kluber (7-5) || Anderson (5-3) || || 21,269 || 38-40
|-  style="text-align:center; background:#fbb;"
| 79 || June 27 || @ Mariners || 3-2 || Young (7-4) || Bauer (2-4) || Rodney (22) || 28,084 || 38-41
|-  style="text-align:center; background:#bfb;"
| 80 || June 28 || @ Mariners || 5-0 || Tomlin (5-5) || Elias (7-6) || || 23,012 || 39-41
|-  style="text-align:center; background:#fbb;"
| 81 || June 29 || @ Mariners || 3-0 || Hernández (10-2) || House (0-2) || Rodney (23) || 26,171 || 39-42
|-  style="text-align:center; background:#fbb;"
| 82 || June 30 || @ Dodgers || 1-0 || Haren (8-4) || Kluber (7-6) || Jansen (25) || 45,627 || 39-43
|-

|-  style="text-align:center; background:#bfb;"
| 83 || July 1 || @ Dodgers || 10-3 || Crockett (2-0) || Beckett (5-5) || || 46,300 || 40-43
|-  style="text-align:center; background:#bfb;"
| 84 || July 2 || @ Dodgers || 5-4 || Shaw (3-1) || Wilson (1-3) || Allen (8) || 50,199 || 41-43
|-  style="text-align:center; background:#fbb;"
| 85 || July 4 || Royals || 7-1 || Ventura (6-7) || Tomlin (5-6) || || 39,020 || 41-44
|-  style="text-align:center; background:#bfb;"
| 86 || July 5 || Royals || 7-3 || House (1-2) || Guthrie (5-7) || || 24,481 || 42-44
|-  style="text-align:center; background:#bfb;"
| 87 || July 6 || Royals || 4-1 || Kluber (8-6) || Duffy (5-8) || Allen (9) || 16,991 || 43-44
|-  style="text-align:center; background:#fbb;"
| 88 || July 7 || Yankees || 5-3 || Greene (1-0) || Masterson (4-6) || Betances (1) || 21,558 || 43-45 
|-  style="text-align:center; background:#bfb;"
| 89 || July 8 || Yankees || 5-3 || Bauer (3-4) || Tanaka (12-4) || Allen (10) || 23,384 || 44-45
|-  style="text-align:center; background:#fbb;"
| 90 || July 9 || Yankees || 5-4 (14) || Whitley (4-2) || Pestano (0-1) || Robertson (22) || 21,727 || 44-46
|-  style="text-align:center; background:#bfb;"
| 91 || July 10 || Yankees || 9-3 || Carrasco (2-3) || Thornton (0-3) || || 28,334 || 45-46
|-  style="text-align:center; background:#bfb;"
| 92 || July 11 || White Sox || 7-4 || Kluber (9-6) || Noesí (3-7) || Allen (11) || 24,652 || 46-46
|-  style="text-align:center; background:#fbb;"
| 93 || July 12 || White Sox || 6-2 || Carroll (4-5) || McAllister (3-5) || || 23,837 || 46-47
|-  style="text-align:center; background:#bfb;"
| 94 || July 13 || White Sox || 3-2 || Shaw (4-1) || Guerra (0-2) || Allen (12) || 18,070 || 47-47
|-  style="text-align:center; background:#bfb;"
| 95 || July 18 || @ Tigers || 9-3 || Bauer (4-4) || Sánchez (6-4) || || 42,255 || 48-47
|-  style="text-align:center; background:#bfb;"
| 96 || July 19 || @ Tigers || 6-2 || Kluber (10-6) || VerHagen (0-1) || || 38,109 || 49-47
|-  style="text-align:center; background:#bfb;"
| 97 || July 19 || @ Tigers || 5-2 || Carrasco (3-3) || Nathan (4-3) || Allen (13) || 42,044 || 50-47
|-  style="text-align:center; background:#fbb;"
| 98 || July 20 || @ Tigers || 5-1 || Smyly (6-8) || Tomlin (5-7) || || 41,736 || 50-48
|-  style="text-align:center; background:#fbb;"
| 99 || July 21 || @ Twins || 4-3 || Fien (5-4) || Shaw (4-2) || Perkins (23) || 25,109 || 50-49
|-  style="text-align:center; background:#bfb;"
| 100 || July 22 || @ Twins || 8-2 || Salazar (2-4) || Pino (1-3) || || 28,291 || 51-49
|-  style="text-align:center; background:#fbb;"
| 101 || July 23 || @ Twins || 3-1 || Swarzak (2-0) || Bauer (4-5) || Perkins (24) || 34,608 || 51-50
|-  style="text-align:center; background:#fbb;"
| 102 || July 24 || @ Royals || 2-1 (14) || Crow (5-1) || Rzepczynski (0-3) || || 22,120 || 51-51
|-  style="text-align:center; background:#fbb;"
| 103 || July 25 || @ Royals || 6-4 || Herrera (2-2) || Carrasco (3-4) || Crow (2) || 33,460 || 51-52
|-  style="text-align:center; background:#fbb;"
| 104 || July 26 || @ Royals || 7-5 || Guthrie (6-9) || McAllister (3-6) || Holland (27) || 29,567 || 51-53
|-  style="text-align:center; background:#bfb;"
| 105 || July 27 || @ Royals || 10-3 || Salazar (3-4) || Chen (2-3) || || 23,409 || 52-53
|-  style="text-align:center; background:#fbb;"
| 106 || July 29 || Mariners || 5-2 || Iwakuma (9-5) || Bauer (4-6) || Rodney (29) || 15,713 || 52-54
|-  style="text-align:center; background:#bfb;"
| 107 || July 30 || Mariners || 2-0 || Kluber (11-6) || Hernández (11-3) || || 14,863 || 53-54
|-  style="text-align:center; background:#fbb;"
| 108 || July 31 || Mariners || 6-5 || Beimel (3-1) || Shaw (4-3) || Rodney (30) || 16,336 || 53-55
|-

|-  style="text-align:center; background:#bfb;"
| 109 || August 1 || Rangers || 12-2 || Salazar (4-4) || Williams (2-5) || || 27,009 || 54-55
|-  style="text-align:center; background:#bfb;"
| 110 || August 2 || Rangers || 2-0 || Atchison (4-0) || Mikolas (1-4) || Allen (14) || 28,285 || 55-55
|-  style="text-align:center; background:#bfb;"
| 111 || August 3 || Rangers || 4-3 (12) || Atchison (5-0) || Klein (0-1) || || 18,422 || 56-55
|-  style="text-align:center; background:#bfb;"
| 112 || August 4 || Reds || 7-1 || Kluber (12-6) || Simón (12-7) || Axford (10) || 18,696 || 57-55
|-  style="text-align:center; background:#fbb;"
| 113 || August 5 || Reds || 9-2 || Cueto (13-6) || Tomlin (5-8) || || 22,068 || 57-56
|-  style="text-align:center; background:#fbb;"
| 114 || August 6 || @ Reds || 8-3 || Latos (4-3) || Salazar (4-5) || || 33,863 || 57-57
|-  style="text-align:center; background:#fbb;"
| 115 || August 7 || @ Reds || 4-0 || Bailey (9-5) || House (1-3) || || 31,862 || 57-58
|-  style="text-align:center; background:#fbb;"
| 116 || August 8 || @ Yankees || 10-6 || Rogers (2-0) || Bauer (4-7) || || 43,972 || 57-59
|-  style="text-align:center; background:#bfb;"
| 117 || August 9 || @ Yankees || 3-0 || Kluber (13-6) || McCarthy (7-11) || Allen (15) || 47,376 ||  58-59
|-  style="text-align:center; background:#bfb;"
| 118 || August 10 || @ Yankees || 4-1 || Carrasco (4-4) || Kuroda (7-8) || || 46,152 ||  59-59
|-  style="text-align:center; background:#bbb;"
| – || August 12 || Diamondbacks || colspan=6| Postponed (rain). Makeup: August 13
|-  style="text-align:center; background:#bfb;"
| 119 || August 13 || Diamondbacks || 3-2 || Allen (4-2) || Delgado (1-3) || || — || 60-59
|-  style="text-align:center; background:#fbb;"
| 120 || August 13 || Diamondbacks || 1-0 (12) || Delgado (2-3) || Lee (0-1) || Reed (28) || 17,562 || 60-60
|-  style="text-align:center; background:#bfb;"
| 121 || August 15 || Orioles || 2-1 (11) || Atchison (6-0) || Matusz (2-3) || || 27,845 || 61-60
|-  style="text-align:center; background:#bfb;"
| 122 || August 16 || Orioles || 6-0 || Carrasco (5-4) || Jiménez (4-9) || || 27,881 || 62-60
|-  style="text-align:center; background:#fbb;"
| 123 || August 17 || Orioles || 4-1 || Gausman (7-4) || Salazar (4-6) || Britton (26) || 22,564 || 62-61
|-  style="text-align:center; background:#bfb;"
| 124 || August 19 || @ Twins || 7-5 || Crockett (3-0) || Duensing (3-3) || Allen (16) || 26,358 || 63-61
|-  style="text-align:center; background:#bfb;"
| 125 || August 20 || @ Twins || 5-0 || House (2-3) || Nolasco (5-9) || || 28,943 || 64-61
|-  style="text-align:center; background:#fbb;"
| 126 || August 21 || @ Twins || 4-1 || Hughes (14-8) || Kluber (13-7) || Perkins (32) || 28,033 || 64-62
|-  style="text-align:center; background:#fbb;"
| 127 || August 22 || Astros || 5-1 || Sipp (4-2) || Allen (4-3) || || 18,743 || 64-63
|-  style="text-align:center; background:#bfb;"
| 128 || August 23 || Astros || 3-2 || Allen (5-3) || Buchanan (1-3) || || 20,785 || 65-63
|-  style="text-align:center; background:#bfb;"
| 129 || August 24 || Astros || 3-1 || Bauer (5-7) || Oberholtzer (4-9) || Allen (17) || 17,123 || 66-63
|-  style="text-align:center; background:#bfb;"
| 130 || August 26 || @ White Sox || 8-6 (10) || Shaw (5-3) || Petricka (0-4) || || 12,462 || 67-63
|-  style="text-align:center; background:#fbb;"
| 131 || August 27 || @ White Sox || 3-2 || Noesí (8-9) || Kluber (13-8) || Putnam (4) || 11,976 || 67-64
|-  style="text-align:center; background:#bfb;"
| 132 || August 28 || @ White Sox || 3-2 || Carrasco (6-4) || Danks (9-9) || Allen (18) || 13,016 || 68-64
|-  style="text-align:center; background:#bfb;"
| 133 || August 29 || @ Royals || 6-1 || Salazar (5-6) || Vargas (10-7) || || 31,341 || 69-64
|-  style="text-align:center; background:#bfb;"
| 134 || August 30 || @ Royals || 3-2 (11) || Tomlin (6-8) || Downs (0-4) || || 35,089 || 70-64
|-  style="text-align:center; background:#bfb;"
| 135 || August 31 || @ Royals || 4-2 (10) || Allen (6-3) || Holland (1-3) || Atchison (2) || 39,009 || 71-64 
|-

|-  style="text-align:center; background:#fbb;"
| 136 || September 1 || Tigers || 12-1 || Price (13-10) || Kluber (13-9) || || 23,296 || 71-65
|-  style="text-align:center; background:#fbb;"
| 137 || September 2 || Tigers || 4-2 || Coke (3-2) || Allen (6-4) || Nathan (29) || 9,990 || 71-66
|-  style="text-align:center; background:#bfb;"
| 138 || September 3 || Tigers || 7-0 || Salazar (6-6) || Verlander (12-12) || || 11,739 || 72-66
|-  style="text-align:center; background:#fbb;"
| 139 || September 4 || Tigers || 11-4 (11) || Coke (4-2) || Tomlin (6-9) || || 11,935 || 72-67
|-  style="text-align:center; background:#bfb;"
| 140 || September 5 || White Sox || 2-1 (10) || Lee (1-1) || Cleto (0-1) || || 15,531 || 73-67
|-  style="text-align:center; background:#bfb;"
| 141 || September 6 || White Sox || 3-1 || Kluber (14-9) || Putnam (4-3) || || 17,367 || 74-67
|-  style="text-align:center; background:#bfb;"
| 142 || September 7 || White Sox || 2-0 || Carrasco (7-4) || Carroll (5-10) || Allen (19) || 17,957 || 75-67
|-  style="text-align:center; background:#fbb;"
| 143 || September 8 || Angels || 12-3 || Weaver (16-8) || Salazar (6-7) || || 15,116 || 75-68
|-  style="text-align:center; background:#fbb;"
| 144 || September 9 || Twins || 4-3 || May (2-4) || Bauer (5-8) || Burton (2) || 9,489 || 75-69
|-  style="text-align:center; background:#bbb;"
| — || September 10 || Twins || colspan=6| Postponed (rain). Makeup: September 11
|-  style="text-align:center; background:#bfb;"
| 145 || September 11 || Twins || 8-2 || Kluber (15-9) || Gibson (11-11) || || — || 76-69
|-  style="text-align:center; background:#bfb;"
| 146 || September 11 || Twins || 2-0 || House (3-3) || Nolasco (5-11) || Allen (20) || 12,637 || 77-69
|-  style="text-align:center; background:#fbb;"
| 147 || September 12 || @ Tigers || 7-2 || Price (14-11) || Carrasco (7-5) || || 38,341 || 77-70
|-  style="text-align:center; background:#fbb;"
| 148 || September 13 || @ Tigers || 5-4 || Chamberlain (2-5) || Shaw (5-4) || Nathan (31) || 41,190 || 77-71
|-  style="text-align:center; background:#fbb;"
| 149 || September 14 || @ Tigers || 6-4 || Coke (5-2) || Shaw (5-5) || Nathan (32) || 39,395 || 77-72
|-  style="text-align:center; background:#fbb;"
| 150 || September 15 || @ Astros || 3-1 || McHugh (10-9) || McAllister (3-7) || Qualls (18) || 17,403 || 77-73
|-  style="text-align:center; background:#bfb;"
| 151 || September 16 || @ Astros || 4-2 || Kluber (16-9) || Tropeano (1-1) || Allen (21) || 18,381 || 78-73
|-  style="text-align:center; background:#bfb;"
| 152 || September 17 || @ Astros || 2-0 || Carrasco (8-5) || Oberholtzer (5-12) || || 18,474 || 79-73
|-  style="text-align:center; background:#bfb;"
| 153 || September 18 || @ Astros || 2-1 (13) || Crockett (4-0) || Deduno (2-6) || Allen (22) || 16,417 || 80-73
|-  style="text-align:center; background:#fbb;"
| 154 || September 19 || @ Twins || 5-4 (10) || Burton (3-5) || Crockett (4-1) || || 28,400 || 80-74
|-  style="text-align:center; background:#bfb;"
| 155 || September 20 || @ Twins || 7-3 || House (4-3) || May (3-5) || Rzepczynski (1) || 28,316|| 81-74
|-  style="text-align:center; background:#bfb;"
| 156 || September 21 || @ Twins || 7-2 || Kluber (17-9) || Swarzak (3-2) || || 24,451 || 82-74
|-  style="text-align:center; background:#fbb;"
| 157 || September 22 || Royals || 2-0 || Duffy (9-11) || Carrasco (8-6) || Holland (44) || 10,458 || 82-75
|-  style="text-align:center; background:#fbb;"
| 158 || September 23 || Royals || 7-1 || Ventura (14-10) || Salazar (6-8) || || 11,735 || 82-76
|-  style="text-align:center; background:#bfb;"
| 159 || September 24 || Royals || 6-4 || McAllister (4-7) || Finnegan (0-1) || Allen (23) || 13,796 || 83-76
|-  style="text-align:center; background:#bfb;"
| 160 || September 26 || Rays || 1-0 || Kluber (18-9) || Archer (10-9) || Allen (24) || 23,131 || 84-76
|-  style="text-align:center; background:#fbb;"
| 161 || September 27 || Rays || 2-0 || Colomé (2-0) || Carrasco (8-7) || McGee (19) || 33,025 || 84-77
|-  style="text-align:center; background:#bfb;"
| 162 || September 28 || Rays || 7-2 || House (5-3) || Cobb (10-9) || || 21,400 || 85-77
|-

Player stats

Batting
Note: G = Games played; AB = At bats; R = Runs scored; H = Hits; 2B = Doubles; 3B = Triples; HR = Home runs; RBI = Runs batted in; AVG = Batting average; SB = Stolen bases

Pitching
Note: W = Wins; L = Losses; ERA = Earned run average; G = Games pitched; GS = Games started; SV = Saves; IP = Innings pitched; H = Hits allowed; R = Runs allowed; ER = Earned runs allowed; BB = Walks allowed; K = Strikeouts

Roster

Notes/Records
On March 31, umpire Mike Winters became the first umpire to initiate a review under Major League Baseball's new replay system, wanting to confirm that Athletics catcher John Jaso did not block the plate unnecessarily as Michael Brantley attempted to score.
On April 10, Danny Salazar became the first pitcher in the modern era (since 1900) to record 10 strikeouts before the end of the fourth inning of a game.
On April 24, Corey Kluber became the first Indians pitcher to throw a complete game with 11+ strikeouts, 0 walks, and 0 earned runs since Len Barker's perfect game on May 15, 1981.
On May 4, George Kottaras became the first player in franchise history to hit home runs in his first two at-bats as an Indian.
On May 14, David Murphy and Lonnie Chisenhall both had 5 hits, the first time two Indians players had done so in the same nine-inning game since 1928.
On May 21, the Indians defeated the Detroit Tigers 11-10 in 13 innings on a walk-off balk, the first one in the majors since July 4, 2011, and the first in extra innings since June 16, 2011.
Corey Kluber recorded 60 strikeouts in May, the first Indians pitcher with 60+ strikeouts in a month since Dennis Eckersley in September 1976.
On June 9, Lonnie Chisenhall became the first player to go 5-5 with 3 HR and 9 RBI since MLB began tracking RBI in 1920. The 9 RBI tied a franchise record, also accomplished by Chris James in 1991.
On September 26, the Indians set a major league record for strikeouts by pitchers with 1,431, breaking the mark set by the 2013 Detroit Tigers. They ended the season with 1,450.
On November 12, Corey Kluber became the 4th Indians pitcher to win the American League Cy Young Award.

Farm system

LEAGUE CHAMPIONS: AZL Indians

References

External links

 2014 Cleveland Indians season at Baseball-Reference.com
 2014 Cleveland Indians Schedule and Statistics at MLB.com

Cleveland Guardians seasons
Cleveland
2014 in sports in Ohio